A truckside advertisement or truckside ad is a billboard that is affixed to a truck that is  for the purpose of advertising to the general public. This is a form of outdoor advertising classified as transit advertising by the outdoor advertising association of America.

Truckside advertisements have been argued by many to have one of the lowest CPM (Cost Per Thousand) impressions available to advertisers in the market. with a cost coming in at 81 cents per thousand compared to 10.40 for a 30-second TV commercial on a prime-time network, 11.03 for a quarter page newspaper ad, and 9.14 for a four-color magazine ad.

One of the largest truckside advertising companies in the United States is called Rolling Adz that has nationwide platform of over 5,500 trucks across the country.

See also
Bus advertising
Driven media
Fleet media
Mobile billboard
Out-of-home advertising
Wrap advertising

References

Advertising by medium
Billboards